Gumercindo Castellanos Flores (born 21 September 1953) is a Mexican politician from the National Action Party. From 2009 to 2012 he served as Deputy of the LXI Legislature of the Mexican Congress representing Jalisco. He previously served as a local deputy in the LVIII Legislature of the Congress of Jalisco and as municipal president of Zapotlán del Rey.

References

1953 births
Living people
Politicians from Aguascalientes
Politicians from Jalisco
National Action Party (Mexico) politicians
21st-century Mexican politicians
People from Calvillo Municipality
Deputies of the LXI Legislature of Mexico
Members of the Chamber of Deputies (Mexico) for Jalisco
Members of the Congress of Jalisco
Municipal presidents in Jalisco